Marty Essen is an American naturalist, author, photographer, and professional speaker. He has written seven books, Cool Creatures, Hot Planet: Exploring the Seven Continents, Endangered Edens: Exploring the Arctic National Wildlife Refuge, Costa Rica, the Everglades, and Puerto Rico, Time Is Irreverent, Time Is Irreverent 2: Jesus Christ, Not Again! Time Is Irreverent 3: Gone for 16 Seconds, Hits, Heathens, and Hippos: Stories from an Agent, Activist, and Adventurer, and Doctor Refurb. 
.

Early life
Essen was born in Duluth, Minnesota, United States. He attended Duluth East High School and University of Minnesota Duluth.

Career
Essen worked as a radio announcer at WEBC-AM and KQDS-FM. In 1982, he moved to Minneapolis, Minnesota, where he ran two music talent management agencies, National Talent Associates and Twin City Talent. In 1996, Essen moved to Victor, Montana to found Essen Communications Corporation, a local telephone company, and later became an author and a college speaker.

His first book, Cool Creatures, Hot Planet, became a Minneapolis Star-Tribune Top-10 Green Book. He performs a live college show, Around the World in 90 Minutes, based on Cool Creatures, Hot Planet. One adventure, documented in both his first book and his live show, is surviving a hippo attack in Zimbabwe.

Essen's nature photography is featured prominently in his books and live show. His outdoor photographs are also in Deb Essen's book, Easy Weaving with Supplemental Warps: Overshot, Velvet, Shibori, and More. Magazines publishing his photos include Reptiles Magazine and Handwoven Magazine.

Essen's three nonfiction books advocate for protecting endangered species and the environment, and his four fiction books are science-fiction political-comedies that advocate for the protection of human rights and the environment.

Personal life
Essen resides in Victor, Montana and is married to weaving designer and author Deb Essen.

Book awards
 2006 Foreword Reviews' INDIEFAB Book of the Year Award Winner (Bronze)
 2007 Benjamin Franklin Award for Travel/Essay
 2007 Ippy Award for Travel/Essay (Bronze)
 2009 Green Book Festival Award for Animals
 2016 Nautilus Award for Animals & Nature (Silver)
 2016 Nautilus Award for Middle Grades Non-Fiction (Silver)

Books
 Cool Creatures, Hot Planet: Exploring the Seven Continents
 Endangered Edens: Exploring the Arctic National Wildlife Refuge, Costa Rica, the Everglades, and Puerto Rico
 Time Is Irreverent
 Time Is Irreverent 2: Jesus Christ, Not Again!
 Time Is Irreverent 3: Gone for 16 Seconds
 Hits, Heathens, and Hippos: Stories from an Agent, Activist, and Adventurer
 Doctor Refurb

Live Shows
Essen has been touring the United States, performing Around the World in 90 Minutes, at hundreds of colleges since 2007.

References

External links
 Official website

American travel writers
American non-fiction outdoors writers
American naturalists
Living people
American male non-fiction writers
Writers from Montana
Nature photographers
American photographers
People from Duluth, Minnesota
People from Victor, Montana
Year of birth missing (living people)